The Americas Zone is one of the three zones of regional Davis Cup competition in 2013.

In the Americas Zone in 2013 there are three different groups in which teams compete against each other to advance to the next group.

Participating nations

Format
The teams will be split into two groups, playing a round-robin, with the winner of each group playing the runner-up of the other group for promotion to Division II in 2014.

It will played on the week commencing 17 June 2012 at La Paz, Bolivia and it will be played on outdoor clay court.

Pools

Play-offs

See also
 2013 Davis Cup
 2013 Davis Cup Americas Zone Group I
 2013 Davis Cup Americas Zone Group II

References

External links
Official Site

Americas Zone III
Davis Cup Americas Zone